The 2019 International Challenger Zhangjiagang was a professional tennis tournament played on hard courts. It was the third edition of the tournament which was part of the 2019 ATP Challenger Tour. It took place in Zhangjiagang, China between 18 and 24 March 2019.

Singles main-draw entrants

Seeds

 1 Rankings are as of 4 March 2019.

Other entrants
The following players received wildcards into the singles main draw:
  Gao Xin
  He Yecong
  Hua Runhao
  Xia Zihao
  Zhang Zhizhen

The following player received entry into the singles main draw using a protected ranking:
  Daniel Nguyen

The following player received entry into the singles main draw as an alternate:
  Makoto Ochi

The following players received entry into the singles main draw using their ITF World Tennis Ranking:
  Baptiste Crepatte
  Ivan Gakhov
  Kim Cheong-eui
  Karim-Mohamed Maamoun

The following players received entry from the qualifying draw:
  Harri Heliövaara
  Sun Fajing

Champions

Singles

 Marc Polmans def.  Lorenzo Giustino 6–4, 4–6, 7–6(7–4).

Doubles

 Max Purcell /  Luke Saville def.  Sriram Balaji /  Hans Hach Verdugo 6–2, 7–6(7–5).

References

2019 ATP Challenger Tour
2019
Zhang
March 2019 sports events in China